The 92nd Military Police Brigade (92nd MP Bde) is a military police brigade of the Puerto Rico Army National Guard. The brigade was formerly an infantry brigade combat team known as the 92nd Infantry Brigade Combat Team and then a Maneuver Enhancement Brigade. It includes two MP battalions, one infantry battalion and some support units.

History
During World War II and on up to the time of the Korean War, the US Army was racially segregated. As a result, the 295th, 296th, and 65th Infantry regiments were all formations consisting mostly of Puerto Rican enlisted men and National Guardsmen.

The 92nd Infantry Brigade was established on 15 February 1959 as a separate combined arms brigade during the Pentomic reorganization of the Puerto Rico Army National Guard, replacing the 295th and 296th Regimental Combat Teams. 

The 92nd Infantry Brigade Combat Team reorganized as the 92nd Maneuver Enhancement Brigade on 1 September 2008. The current formation still retains two of the former brigade infantry battalions, which are the 1st battalion of the 296th Infantry Regiment and the 1st battalion of the 65th Infantry Regiment. Other units integrated into the brigade are an additional military police battalion, a combat engineer battalion and several more combat support and combat service support elements. Maneuver Enhancement Brigades is designed to bridge the operational gap between Brigade Combat Teams and Functional Support Brigades. By modern doctrine MEB can control operational areas and are assigned a Tactical Combat Force, usually in the form of a maneuver infantry battalion. A Maneuver Enhancement Brigade mission is to provide the divisional commander with a field grade officer led formation that has a large headquarters, capable of controlling a mix of combat engineer, military police, level II medical services, communication units, NBC units and civil affair units, in addition to its attached maneuver combat battalion for security and rear area defense operations. This transformation is tailored to the needs of the U.S. Army in its role in the war against terrorism. Most of the brigade members are veteran soldiers of several combat activation. The 92nd Maneuver Enhancement Brigade is the largest combat unit in the Puerto Rico ARNG.

The brigade was reorganized as the 92nd Military Police Brigade on 1 September 2016.

Structure

 Executive branch of the government of Puerto Rico 
National Guard Bureau 
United States Department of the Army
Puerto Rico National Guard 
Puerto Rico Army National Guard
92nd Military Police Brigade 
92nd MP Headquarters & Headquarters Company, Caguas, Puerto Rico
1st Battalion, 65th Infantry Regiment| Cayey, Puerto Rico
Headquarters and Headquarters Company (HHC) | Cayey, Puerto Rico
Alpha Company | Aibonito, Puerto Rico
Bravo Company | Guayama, Puerto Rico
Charlie Company | Coamo, Puerto Rico
Delta Company | Juncos, Puerto Rico 
India Company | Cayey, Puerto Rico
1st Battalion, 296th Infantry Regiment| Mayaguez, Puerto Rico
Headquarters and Headquarters Company (HHC) | Mayaguez, Puerto Rico
Alpha Company | Utuado, Puerto Rico
Bravo Company | Mayaguez, Puerto Rico
Charlie Company | Cabo Rojo, Puerto Rico
Delta Company | Mayaguez, Puerto Rico 
India Company | Mayaguez, Puerto Rico
125th Military Police Battalion | Headquarters and Headquarters Detachment (HHD) | Ponce, Puerto Rico
755th Military Police Company | Arecibo, Puerto Rico
544th Military Police Company | Aguadilla, Puerto Rico
124th Military Police Battalion | Headquarters and Headquarters Detachment (HHD)| Fort Buchanan, Puerto Rico
225th Military Police Company | Fort Buchanan, Puerto Rico
480th Military Police Company | Fort Buchanan, Puerto Rico

Heraldry 
The shoulder sleeve insignia was authorized on 16 June 1964. The colors blue and white are used for Infantry units in the US Army. The blue area and white wavy base refer to the Caribbean and the white disc to the Island of Puerto Rico, the white disc also simulating a pearl. The furison, a steel device for striking against flint to create a fire, is an ancient heraldic symbol and simulates a battle sight on a rifle. Furisons also form links in the collar of the Order of the Golden Fleece, the foremost Spanish order of chivalry, and refer to the discovery and settlement of Puerto Rico by the Spanish. In this instance, the blue area within the furison refers to San Juan Harbor, the opening between the arms of the furison alluding to "puerto" a harbor and the yellow furison itself to the surrounding land area and natural opulence of the island. The cross on the furison alludes to San Juan and appears on the banner in the crest of the Puerto Rican National Guard. The cross in this instance is red, yellow and red being the colors of Spain.

The distinctive unit insignia was authorized for the noncolor bearing units of the 92nd Infantry Brigade on 19 April 1967, with the motto amended on 12 June 1967. The red sentry tower was suggested by El Morro at San Juan and the yellow disc alludes to the tropical sun, red and yellow also being the colors of the Spanish who discovered and first settled in Puerto Rico. The machetes refer to the cutting of sugar cane, a major source of wealth in the Island, and are also extremely effective offensive weapons. Crossed in front of the sentry tower, they allude to constant vigilance and readiness to defend Puerto Rico. Blue, red and yellow are also the colors of the three major combat arms and the motto "A Lo Que Vinimos" may be translated to "What we came for".

See also

Military history of Puerto Rico
Puerto Rico Adjutant General

References

Citations

Bibliography

External links
The Institute of Heraldry: 92nd Infantry Brigade
GlobalSecurity.org: 92nd Infantry Brigade

092
Military units and formations in Puerto Rico
Puerto Rico Army National Guard
Military units and formations established in 1964